The highland streaked tenrec (Hemicentetes nigriceps) is an insectivore which lives in the central upland regions of Madagascar. Its black and white striped body is covered with quills, which it will raise when agitated. The spines detach and remain in the body of an inquisitive predator. The function of the black-and-white pattern may be to mimic juvenile Tenrec ecaudatus since the parents of this species are known to be aggressively protective, and the stripes may have developed as a type of camouflage while foraging. The highland streaked tenrec uses its long snout to burrow under leaves and bark, searching for earthworms, its primary food.

References

 

Endemic fauna of Madagascar
Mammals described in 1875
Taxa named by Albert Günther